Stéphan Buckland (also written Stéphane Buckland; born 12 January 1977) is a retired Mauritian track and field athlete who competed in the 100 and 200 metres.

Biography 
Buckland's international career began in 1998 after joining the IAAF High Performance Training Centre in Dakar, Senegal. Under coach Dr Herve Stephan, he has progressed to be ready in participating in many international world class track and field meetings. In 1999, he competed in several meetings in Italy and France. He ran a season best and personal best of 10.22 at the Meeting of La Roche Sur Yon in France which at that time was also a national record for Mauritius and eventually achieved the qualifying standards to enter the 100m event at the IAAF World Athletics Championships in Sevilla, Spain. At these Championships, he reached the quarterfinals by finishing fifth in 10.39. After these Championships, he reached the final of the 100m at the All Africa Games finishing last and taking fifth place in the 4 × 100 m relay.

In 2000, Buckland broke his 100 record three times, running 10.16 at the Meeting Internacional Atletismo Funchal in Funchal, Portugal. In Funchal, Buckland also ran a national record of 20.31 smashing the former Mauritian record of 20.72 held by Eric Milazar. Earlier that year, he ran his first official 200m race at the Mauritian International Meeting and broke the meeting record as well as the national record with a time of 20.66. He ran a meeting record of 20.43 in the 200m at the Meeting Atletica Internazionale Barletta, which he still holds today. He also won the 100m in 10.29 at this meeting. Other performances include two silver medals at the African Athletics Championships, taking second places in the 100m in 10.20 and the 4 × 100 m relay. His major breakthrough that year was his amazing performance at the Sydney Olympic Games in Australia. He reached the quarterfinals of the 100m by winning his heat in 10.35. He impressed many again by reaching the 200m semifinal finishing fifth in 20.56 and missing the final by a couple of milliseconds. After this performance, Buckland decided to focus mainly on the 200m event and continued to specialize in it.

In 2001, Buckland became the first athlete in history to win the 100m, 200m and the 4 × 100 m relay at the Francophone Games in Ottawa, Canada. In the 100m, he beat Canadian Bruny Surin, one of the fastest man on Earth, in a time of 10.13, setting a new national record. He then won the 200m final in 20.33 after winning his qualification and semifinal races in 20.62 and 20.66 respectively. He then anchored the Mauritian relay team to gold with a new national record of 39.04. What followed was even better. At the IAAF World Athletics Championships in Edmonton, Canada, Stephan Buckland reached the final for the first time finishing sixth in 20.24. He broke the national record in his quarterfinal race running 20.23 and then again the following day, in his semifinal race with a time of 20.15. He also reached the semifinal of the 4 × 100 m relay with Eric Milazar, Fernando Augustin, and Arnaud Casquette by setting a new national record of 38.99 seconds. With all these amazing performances, many Mauritians had found their new national hero and Buckland was given an honourable welcome after his return from Edmonton. Together with Eric Milazar, who finished fourth in the 400m at the World Championships, they were congratulated by the Prime Minister and treated with a parade in Port Louis. His performance also gave him entry to many Golden League competitions in Europe. He finished seventh at the Weltklasse Golden League in Zurich, Switzerland and again at the Memorial Van Damme Golden League in Bruxelles, Belgium, in times of 20.63 and 20.42 respectively. He was also selected to represent Mauritius at the Goodwill Games in Brisbane, Australia where he took seventh place in 20.92. He ended his season by running his first 300m race at the Apres Midi Des Stars Meeting Reduit, taking second place and beaten by compatriot Eric Milazar. This race was more of a treat for the public who came in large numbers to see the island's two best athletes square off.

In 2002, Buckland was haunted by injuries and had to end his season prematurely. He equalled his national record of 10.13 at the 	Mauritius International Meeting on home soil and went on to participate in many European competitions. He took fifth place at the Golden Gala Golden League Meeting in Rome and took fourth place at the Athens Grand Prix in Greece in a season's best of 20.31. He participated at the Commonwealth Games in Manchester, England and won his 200 heat in 20.91 and his quarterfinal race in 20.77. He was injured in the semifinal and finished sixth in 20.61 and unable to reach the final although he was a serious medal contender. This injury also disabled him from competing at the African Athletics Championships in Tunisia where compatriot Eric Milazar won the 400m.

In 2003, Buckland bounced back at the international scene where he took third place in the 200m at the Rome Golden League in 20.48. He then won the 200m at the KBC Night of Athletics, Belgium in a time of 20.33. He finished second at the Athens Grand Prix in 20.32. Other performances include fourth place at the Gaz de France Golden League in Paris, France in 20.42. He was then promoted to third place after the disqualification of an American athlete due to doping. At the Meeting International Resisprint, Buckland won the 200m in 20.29, a new meeting record which he still holds today. At the 2003 9th IAAF World Athletics Championships, Buckland reached the final for the second time finishing fifth in 20.41. He broke the national record in the quarterfinal, running 20.06 seconds, making him the third fastest 200m sprinter on the African continent. He also ran 20.11 in his semifinal race finishing second behind American Darvis Patton and automatically qualified for the final. After his return from the World Championships, Buckland participated at the Indian Ocean Island Games where he won three gold medals in the 100m (10.60), the 200m (20.64) and 4 × 100 m relay (39.23). He broke the Games record in the 200m qualification in 20.46, a record that still holds today as well as in the 4 × 100 m relay where he anchored to 39.23. After the Games, Buckland was selected by the IAAF to participate at the first IAAF World Athletics Final, the second most important athletics competition in the world. This competition was held in Monte Carlo, Monaco. He took the bronze medal in the 200m finishing third in 20.44 and received the IAAF certificate of honour for being among the 10 best 200m athlete in the world.

Buckland is one of the few athletes who has reached the IAAF World Championships in Athletics 200 m final three times consecutively. He did so in 2001, 2003, and 2005. Buckland's international career started in 1999 where he participated in the 1999 World Championships in Athletics held in Sevilla, Spain. After winning numerous international meetings in 2000, he went on to represent Mauritius at the Sydney Olympic Games where he finished fifth in his semifinal race in 20.56. He was also a 100m quarterfinalist at these Olympics. In 2001, Buckland won three gold medals at the Francophone Games held in Ottawa, Ontario, Canada. In 2003, Buckland established a new national record in the 200m with a time of 20.06 in the quarterfinal race at the 2003 IAAF World Championships in Athletics in Paris, France. Buckland came sixth in the 200m final at the 2004 Summer Olympics. In 2006, Buckland won a silver medal in the 200m at the Commonwealth Games in Melbourne, Australia. He went on to represent Mauritius at the 2008 Summer Olympics in Beijing. He competed at the 200 metres where he placed third in his first round heat in a time of 20.98 seconds. He improved his time in the second round to 20.37 seconds, but only finished fifth in his heat. His time was still enough to advance to the semifinals, but he was unable to make it to the finals. In his semifinal race he placed sixth with a time of 20.48 seconds.

In 2008, Stéphan Buckland won the 200m at the IAAF World Athletics Final held in Stuttgart, Germany. To qualify for this prestigious competition, athletes must gain enough points and be among the top eight in the event in the IAAF World Athletics Tour.

In the last decades, Stéphane Buckland proved to be the most prolific athlete for the Mauritian Flag.

Personal Bests

Prize Money Earned from Most Important Competitions

IAAF World rankings

Clubs

Sport Awards

All Achievements in Athletics

African 200m Runners Toplists By Year

All Countries Competed

Fastest 100m Mauritian Sprinters

Fastest 200m Mauritian Sprinters

References

External links
 

 
 
 IAAF: Focus on Athletes

1977 births
Living people
People from Plaines Wilhems District
Mauritian male sprinters
Athletes (track and field) at the 2000 Summer Olympics
Athletes (track and field) at the 2004 Summer Olympics
Athletes (track and field) at the 2008 Summer Olympics
Athletes (track and field) at the 1998 Commonwealth Games
Athletes (track and field) at the 2002 Commonwealth Games
Athletes (track and field) at the 2006 Commonwealth Games
Commonwealth Games silver medallists for Mauritius
Commonwealth Games medallists in athletics
Olympic athletes of Mauritius
World Athletics Championships athletes for Mauritius
Competitors at the 2001 Goodwill Games
Medallists at the 2006 Commonwealth Games